Hossein Abdoh Tabrizi (born September 4, 1951, in Tehran) is an Iranian professor of Finance and a financial practitioner. Since 2013, he is an Honorary Adviser to Minister of Roads and Urban Development (Iran) and a member of Iranian Securities and Exchange Commission. He has been the founder of Eghtesad Novin (EN) Bank, the first Iranian non-governmental bank, and a member of editorial board of various financial journals and the founder and owner of Sarmayeh (The Capital) newspaper. He also had several positions including the Secretary General of Tehran Stock Exchange (2003–2005), adviser to the Minister of Economic Affairs and Finance (Iran) (2001–2005) and many different posts in Iranian financial sector.

Biography 
Hossein Abdoh Tabrizi was born on September 4, 1951, in Tehran, Iran. In 1973, he got his BA in Business from Tehran Business School and a BA in English Translation from Allameh Tabatabaei University. In 1974, he graduated from Iran Center for Management Studies (a Harvard affiliated business school) with a Master of Business Administration (MBA) degree. In 1976, he advanced his academic studies by submitting a PhD degree in the field of Finance and Banking to the Manchester Business School.
Abdoh Tabrizi started teaching in mid-1970s. Since then he has been lecturing in many universities, research centers and organizations including Sharif University of Technology, Tehran University, Shahid Beheshti University, Allameh Tabatabaei University and Imam Sadiq University are among universities where he has been teaching finance. He spent some years at Iran's Institute for Research on Planning and Development, Imam Sadiq University and Allameh Tabatabaei University as a full-time teaching staff. He has been a member of editorial board at various financial journals and the founder and owner of Sarmayeh (The Capital) newspaper.
In recent years his researches extend to areas such as financial crisis of 2007–2008, investigating the economic bubble at Tehran Stock Exchange, capital structure theory, capital market governance, real estate finance and behavioral finance in Tehran Stock Exchange. At the top of his private businesses, Hossein Abdoh Tabrizi had a public life all through these years advising Ministries, Banks, Stock Market, Capital Market and Businesses.

In January of 1401, he claimed that the Tehran stock market has no competitor for continued growth and the housing market has entered a recession and said that a significant part of the people cannot afford housing and the banking system cannot provide facilities for housing purchase. In this situation, the rates in big cities have reached a point where maybe 80% of people cannot afford housing

Education 
 PhD degree in Finance and Banking, Manchester Business School (1976).
 Master of Business Administration, ICMS (a Harvard affiliated business school in Tehran) (1974).
 Bachelor's degree in Business, Tehran Business School (1973).
 Bachelor's degree in English Translation, Allameh Tabatabaei University (1973).

Authorship
 Risk and Return
 Financial Management
 Financial Markets and Instituations
 Cases in Financial Management
 Finance and Investment Articles (1–2)
 Measuring and Managing the Market Risk
 A Dictionary of Finance and Investment
 Chain of Value Creation

Career

Public Portfolio 
 Visiting Professor, Sharif University of Technology (2010–present).
 Visiting Professor, Shahid Beheshti University (1983–present).
 Honorary Adviser to Minister of Roads and Urban Development (2013–2017).
 Honorary Think Tank Member to Minister of Energy (Electricity and Water) (2014–2017).
 Member of Securities and Exchange Commission (2013–2018).
 Member of Electricity Market Regulatory Board (2014–2017).
 Senior Economic Adviser, Tehran Chamber of Commerce (2010–present).
 Senior Economic Adviser, Iran Chamber of Commerce (2014–present).
 Member of Trustee Committee, Urmia University (2010–present).
 Member of Trustee Committee, Haram Reconstruction Fund (2014–2018).
 Editorial board member of a few Academic Journals (1990–present).
 Academic board member of a few National Economic Conferences (1985–present).
 Secretary General, Tehran Stock Exchange (2003–2005).
 Honorary Adviser to Minister of Economic Affairs and Finance (Iran) (2001–2005).
 Secretary General, the Institute of Development of Iran Investment Industry (2006–2008).
 chairman of the board of directors, Iran's Investment Institutions Association (2007–2010).

Private Portfolio 
 Chairman, Taban Kherad Financial Research & Consulting Co. (2006–present).
 Chairman, Kherad Payeh Financial Investment & Consulting Co. (2005–present). 
 Chairman, Sadr Pars Management Group (2008–present). 
 Minor Shareholder in a few companies.
 Owner, Pishbord Publishing House.
 Senior Adviser, EN Investment Bank (2010–present).
 Think Tank Member, Teachers' Pension Fund.
 Senior Adviser, Iran Power Plant Projects Management Company (MAPNA)
 Chairman, Leasing of EN Bank (2006–2010).
 CEO, Novin Investment Bank (2008–2010).
 CEO, Eghtesad Novin Investment Bank (2006–2008).
 Chairman, EN Bank. (2001–2003)
 CEO, Sakhteman Iran Investment Co. (1997–2001).

References

External links 
 http://www.finance.ir
 http://investopedia.ir/

Living people
Iranian economists
People from Tehran
1951 births